Amma is a 1949 Sri Lankan film directed by Sirisena Wimalaweera. It was adapted from one of his plays that bore the same name. The cast included Eddie Junior, Pearl Vasudevi, D. R. Nanayakkara and N. R. Dias and was filmed at the Neptune Studio in Madras.

It was screened at the Central Cinema in Maradana.

Plot
Story involving a mother.

Cast
Pearl Vasudevi as Nila: lead female character
D. R. Nanayakkara as Saranapala
Eddie Junior as Tilaka: lead male character
Upasena Wimalaweera as Young Tilaka
Murin Nissanka as Viola
R. Marshal Perera as Romeo
Carmen Vanidoti as Juliet
N. R. Dias as Juwanis
R. H. Nicholas Perera as Jomi
Sumana Ranasinghe as Noiyahami
Turin Silva
Asilin Ranasinghe
S. H. Jothipala as Samson

Songs
"Harida Viman" – Pearl Vasudevi
"Dawasak Da (virindu)" – Upasena Wimalaweera
"Jeevitha Yatho" – Pearl Vasudevi
"Kama Deiyange Rupe" – D. R. Nanayakkara and Murin Nissanka
"Paya Wala Gabi" – Upasena Wimalweera and female cast member
"Mang Paninewa Kalani Gange" – R. Marshal Perera and Carmen Vanidoti
"Gala Kadagena" – N. R. Dias
"Hawa Pare Durai" – B. F. de Silva and Eddie Junior
"Marga Erelana" – D. R. Nanayakkara
"Karadara Bariye" – R. H. Nicholas Perera and Sumana Ranasinghe

References

1949 films
Sri Lankan films based on plays
Sri Lankan black-and-white films
Films scored by C. N. Pandurangan